Yalkhoy-Mokhk (Yalxoy-Moxk) is a village (selo) in Kurchaloyevsky District, Chechnya.

Administrative and municipal status 
Municipally, Yalkhoy-Mokhk is incorporated as Yalkhoy-Mokhkskoye rural settlement. It is the administrative center of the municipality and one of three settlements included in it.

Geography 

Yalkhoy-Mokhk is located on the right bank of the Gums River.

The nearest settlements to Yalkhoy-Mokhk are Akhkinchu-Borzoy in the north, Gansolchu in the north-east, Turty-Khutor in the east, Malye Shuani in the south-east, Khashki-Mokhk in the south, Enikali and Koren-Benoy in the south-west, Belty in the west, and Khidi-Khutor in the north-west.

Name 
There is a legend that Yalkhoy-Mokhk was founded by a group of six warriors. The name comes from Chechen "ялх" (six), "хой" (warrior), "мохк" (country).

History 
In 1944, after the genocide and deportation of the Chechen and Ingush people and the Chechen-Ingush ASSR was abolished, the village of Yalkhoy-Mokhk was renamed to Tlyadal, and settled by people from the neighbouring republic of Dagestan.

In 1957, when the Vaynakh people returned and the Chechen-Ingush ASSR was restored, the village regained its old Chechen name, Yalkhoy-Mokhk.

Population 
 2002 Census: 4,049
 2010 Census: 4,452
 2018 estimate: unknown

According to the 2010 Census, the majority of residents of Yalkhoy-Mokhk were ethnic Chechens.

References 

Rural localities in Kurchaloyevsky District